The Erdre is a  long river in western France, right tributary to the Loire. Its source is in the Maine-et-Loire department, near La Pouëze. It flows through the departments Maine-et-Loire and Loire-Atlantique. The Erdre meets the Loire in the city of Nantes. Other towns on the Erdre, going downstream, are Candé, Riaillé, Nort-sur-Erdre and Sucé-sur-Erdre.

South of Nort-sur-Erdre, the river flows through reclaimed marshland, and is up to a kilometer wide at the Plaine de Mazerolles near Sucé-sur-Erdre. At the Plaine de la Poupiniere, the Nantes-Brest canal joins the Erdre.

The Erdre flows into the Loire via the  under Rue Henri IV, emerging near the main railway station. Its former course is a main road and shopping area, the Cours des Cinquante Otages.

References

External links
 

Rivers of France
Rivers of Pays de la Loire
Rivers of Maine-et-Loire
Rivers of Loire-Atlantique